This is a list of seasons played by Eintracht Frankfurt in German and European football since 1920 when the club merged and introduced the name Eintracht for the first time. The club was founded in 1899. Eintracht Frankfurt have won the championship once, the DFB-Pokal five times and the UEFA Cup/Europa League twice.

The list details the club's achievements in all major competitions, and the top league goalscorer(s) for each season. For some seasons before 1963, the goalscoring information is incomplete but the player mentioned is almost certainly correct.

Seasons

Key

Pld = Matches played
W = Matches won
D = Matches drawn
L = Matches lost
GF = Goals for
GA = Goals against
Pts = Points
Pos = Final position
QGC = Qualification for the German championship, with varying modes until 1963
KLNM = Kreisliga Nordmain (1st tier from 1919 until 1923)
BLM = Bezirksliga Main (1st tier from 1923 until 1927)
BLMH = Bezirksliga Main-Hessen (1st tier from 1927 until 1933)
GL = Gauliga Südwest/Mainhessen (1st tier from 1933 until 1945)
OL = Oberliga Süd (1st tier from 1945 until 1963)

1. BL = Bundesliga (1st tier since 1963)
2. BL = 2. Bundesliga (2nd tier since 1974)
EC = European Cup
ICFC = Inter-Cities Fairs Cup
ECWC = European Cup Winners' Cup
UC = UEFA Cup
IC = UEFA Intertoto Cup
UEL = UEFA Europa League
UCL = UEFA Champions League
DNE = Did Not Enter
DNQ = Did Not Qualify
QR = Qualification Round
R1 = Round 1
R2 = Round 2
R3 = Round 3
QF = Quarter-finals
SF = Semi-finals
RU = Runners-up

Colour coding

Attendance 
Since the introduction of the Bundesliga in the 1963–64 season, Eintracht Frankfurt play their home matches at Waldstadion.

Remarks: 
 In the period after the second expansion stage of Waldstadion (from 1953 until 1974) there are no official records about the maximum capacity. That is why the official capacity of this period is assumed as 81,000 which is Eintracht's record attendance achieved in a championship match versus FK Pirmasens on 23 May 1959.
 the coloured background displays: Waldstadion II Waldstadion III Commerzbank-Arena Deutsche Bank Park
 The * marked capacity figures point out that the ground has been under renovation.

Notes

References

External links
 Eintracht Frankfurt Archive

Seasons
 
Eintracht Frankfurt
German football club statistics